Greens on Åland was a political party in Åland that won 2 seats in the 1987 election.

References

Defunct green political parties
Defunct political parties in Åland
Green parties in Europe